The SS Empire Miniver was a British steam merchant ship. She was originally an American merchant, launched in 1918 as SS West Cobalt. During a brief stint in the United States Navy in 1919, she was known as USS West Cobalt (ID-3836).

SS West Cobalt was built as a steam-powered cargo ship in 1918 for the United States Shipping Board (USSB). She was part of the West boats, a series of steel-hulled cargo ships built on the West Coast of the United States for the First World War war effort, and was the 11th ship built at Columbia River Shipbuilding Company in Portland, Oregon. Though she was completed too late for the war, she was commissioned into the Naval Overseas Transportation Service (NOTS) of the United States Navy as USS West Cobalt (ID-3836) in January 1919. After her one overseas trip for the Navy—delivering grain products to Danzig—she was decommissioned in May 1919 and returned to the USSB.

West Cobalt had a relatively uneventful merchant career for the USSB and, after her 1933 sale, for the Lykes Brothers Steamship Company. In June 1940, West Cobalt was sold to British interests and renamed Empire Miniver. Just over four months later, the ship was torpedoed and sunk by  while carrying supplies to the UK in Convoy SC 7 during the Second World War. Three crewmen were killed in the attack; the master and 34 others were rescued by a British corvette.

Design and construction 
The West ships were cargo ships of similar size and design built by several shipyards on the West Coast of the United States for the USSB for emergency use during the First World War. All were given names that began with the word West, like West Cobalt, the ninth of some 30 West ships built by the Columbia River Shipbuilding Company of Portland, Oregon. West Cobalt (Columbia River Shipbuilding yard number 11) was launched on 26 October 1918, and was completed in December.

US Navy career 
Upon completion of West Cobalt in December 1918, a month after the end of fighting in the First World War, she was handed over to the United States Navy for use in the NOTS. She was commissioned as USS West Cobalt (ID-3836) on 29 December at the Puget Sound Navy Yard in Bremerton, Washington.

After undergoing sea trials, West Cobalt sailed for San Pedro, California, on 11 January to load a cargo of grain on behalf of the American Relief Administration. Six days later, West Cobalt headed for Norfolk, Virginia, where she arrived on 10 February. After fuel replenishment, West Cobalt sailed on 19 February for Plymouth, where she arrived on 11 March, the Hook of Holland, and Danzig. After delivering her cargo, used to help feed the hungry in the aftermath of the war, she steamed for New York on 8 April. After reaching New York on 24 April, West Cobalt was decommissioned on 5 May and returned to the USSB.

Civilian career 
Many details of West Cobalts post-Navy career remain undiscovered, but mentions in shipping reports in contemporary newspapers offer hints at her activities. In 1924, for example, reports in The New York Times mention a departure from New York for Manchester on 27 August, and an arrival at Liverpool on 8 September. By 1930, West Cobalt was reported in The Washington Post as sailing on a New Orleans – London route. On 15 October of that year, the captain and four other officers of West Cobalt were arrested at New Orleans after  of liquor—against the law under Prohibition—were found on board the ship. The five men were held under $1,000 bond each.

In 1933, West Cobalt was sold to the Lykes Brothers Steamship Company, which assigned her to its Ripley Steamship Company subsidiary. During the 1930s, Lykes Brothers operated cargo ships between Gulf Coast and Caribbean ports, and though there is little specific information available regarding West Cobalts movements, it is likely that she called at Gulf coast and Caribbean ports as well. One specific mention of the ship is found in a report in The New York Times in 1937, when the newspaper reported West Cobalts arrival in New York on 30 October, ten days after sailing from New Orleans.

Second World War 
In June 1940, the United States Maritime Commission (USMC) granted permission to Lykes to sell West Cobalt and three other ships to the Bank Line of Glasgow for transfer to British registry. West Cobalt, loaded with scrap iron, sailed from Hampton Roads, Virginia, on 28 June for Halifax. After arriving there on 2 July, West Cobalt sailed the next day in Convoy HX 55 for Liverpool. On the night of 15/16 July, West Cobalt dropped astern of the convoy and was last sighted at 01:00 by British merchant ship Loch Don. West Cobalt continued on, however, and reached Liverpool independently on 18 July.

Soon transferred to the Ministry of War Transport, the newly renamed ship, now named Empire Miniver, was assigned to Andrew Weir & Co. of London for operation. She sailed from Liverpool in her first wartime convoy under her new name, Convoy OB-205, on 29 August 1940. Though three ships from the convoy were sunk, two were damaged, and a sixth was a total loss, Empire Miniver arrived at Hampton Roads, on 15 September and at Baltimore two days later.

After a nine-day turnaround, Empire Miniver sailed independently to Sydney, Nova Scotia, with a cargo of 4,500 tons of pig iron and 6,200 tons of steel, arriving on 2 October. At Sydney, she joined the ill-fated Convoy SC 7, bound for Newport, for her return journey. The convoy had only a single escort to start with, the sloop . The convoy was located by a wolfpack of U-boats from 16 October, and they quickly overwhelmed the convoy, sinking many of the ships. Out of a total complement of 38, three crew members were lost. Including Empire Miniver, 20 ships—over half of the ships in Convoy SC 7—were sunk by 8 different U-boats.

Notes

References

Bibliography 

 
 

 

Design 1013 ships of the United States Navy
Ships built in Portland, Oregon
1918 ships
World War I cargo ships of the United States
World War I auxiliary ships of the United States
Design 1013 ships of the Ministry of War Transport
World War II merchant ships of the United Kingdom
Ships sunk by German submarines in World War II
World War II shipwrecks in the Atlantic Ocean
Maritime incidents in October 1940